Fred Trueman was an English cricketer, an "aggressive" fast bowler widely known as "Fiery Fred". He is generally acknowledged to have been one of the greatest bowlers in cricket history. He represented England in 67 Test matches, and was the first bowler to take 300 wickets in a Test career, taking twelve years and 65 Tests to reach the landmark.

Trueman's wicket tally included seventeen five-wicket hauls (also known as "five-fors" or "fifers") which refer to a bowler taking five or more wickets in a single innings. This is regarded as a notable achievement,  only 41 bowlers have taken more than 15 five-wicket hauls at international level in their cricketing careers. Trueman's seventeen five-wicket hauls places him joint-third in a list of most five-wicket hauls by England Test players, behind Ian Botham and Sydney Barnes. It includes three instances of him taking five or more wickets in each innings of the same Test match, and only one of the Tests in which he took a five-for ended in defeat for England.

His first five-for came in July 1952 against India in only his third Test match. It was also his career-best performance, eight wickets while conceding 31 runs, which remains the ninth most successful bowling figures by an England player. Five of his five-wicket hauls were taken against Australia, and six came against the West Indies. Four of the latter came during the 1963 West Indies tour of England, across which he took a career-best 34 wickets. He is joint-third in a tally of most five-fors taken against the West Indies in Test matches. He did not get the opportunity to play in One Day International cricket as it was not introduced until the 1970–1971 cricket season, several years after his retirement.

Key

Note: Regular Man of the match awards did not enter Test cricket until the 1980s, after Trueman had retired.

Tests

References
Notes

Sources
 
 

Lists of English cricket records and statistics
Trueman, Fred